Banco Itaú Argentina is an Argentine bank and a subsidiary of the Brazilian bank Itaú Unibanco. It was founded in 1998 after the purchase of Banco Del Buen Ayre. The bank has 99 bank branches and 140 ATMs across the country and more than 400,000 customers.

The bank is one of the largest banks in Argentina and competes with Banco Francés, Banco Macro, Grupo Financiero Galícia, Banco Patagonia, and others.

References

Banks of Argentina
Itaúsa
Itaú Unibanco